A Thousand and One Wives (tr. Elef Neshotav Shel Naftali Siman-Tov, literally "Naftali Siman-Tov's Thousand Wives") is a 1989 Israeli independent underground dramatic-historical art film directed by Michal Bat-Adam.

Synopsis
In the Bukharim quarter, Jerusalem, during the 1920s, merchant Naftali Siman-Tov is a wealthy middle-aged widower, all of whose previous wives have died under mysterious circumstances. He fears getting married again due to believing that he is cursed. A local matchmaker, Arotchas, with the help of some old ladies, pressures him to get married again nonetheless, and, eventually, he marries Flora (Rita Jahanforuz), a naïve 24-year-old virgin. However, in order not to bestow his alleged curse upon her, he avoids all physical touch. Flora gets pregnant as a result of sleeping with a local textile salesman, Hamedian, and, Naftali, unable to bear the shame, becomes violent toward his young wife.

Reception
Writing in Haaretz, critic  opined that Rita Jahanforuz "adds to this film a significant amount of humanity and humor, and, she has a natural filmic presence," while Yedioth Ahronoth critic  wrote that the film presents "a cornucopia of beautiful colors, [showing] a Jerusalem of towels, handsome tools, and, scarfs, really a wonderful parade of lots of tradition, customs, and, folklore, representing all Twelve Tribes of Israel, as if it were a beautiful exhibition by Maskit, with a well-spoken text," Davar critic  noted that the film's main achievement is its treatment of color and light, namely, that the cinematography "creates an almost perfect match between the view that can be seen through the vast Jerusalemite windows (in which the characters walk) and the large rooms within the old tastefully and colorfully decorated stone-made houses," and Al HaMishmar critic  underscored that the film is Michal Bat-Adam's "best and most wholesome film" to date, due to its "reliable and reserved cinematic language creating a correct historical environment and utilizing glowing and careful acting."

References

External links
"A Thousand and One Wives" - The full film is available on VOD on the website for the Israel Film Archive - Jerusalem Cinematheque

A Thousand and One Wives at the TCM Movie Database

1980s historical drama films
1989 independent films
1989 films
Adultery in films
Films about businesspeople
Films about old age
Films about widowhood
Films based on short fiction
Films directed by Michal Bat-Adam
Films set in the 1920s
Films set in Jerusalem
Films shot in Israel
1980s Hebrew-language films
Israeli historical drama films
Israeli independent films
1980s pregnancy films
Women and death
1989 drama films
Israeli pregnancy films